"Telstar" is a 1962 instrumental by the English band the Tornados, written and produced by Joe Meek. It reached number one on the UK Singles Chart and the US Billboard Hot 100 in December 1962 (the second British recording to reach number 1 on that chart in the year, after "Stranger on the Shore" in May). It was the second instrumental single to hit number 1 in 1962 on both the US and UK weekly charts.

Later in 1962, Meek produced a vocal version, "Magic Star", sung by Kenny Hollywood. It was released as a single by Decca Records (cat. nr F11546), with "The Wonderful Story of Love" on the B-side, written by Geoff Goddard. The musical director for both songs was Ivor Raymonde.

Background
"Telstar" was named after the Telstar communications satellite, which was launched into orbit on 10 July 1962. Written and produced by Joe Meek, it featured either a clavioline or the similar Jennings Univox, both keyboard instruments with distinctive electronic sounds. It was recorded in Meek's studio in a small flat above a shop in Holloway Road, North London. "Telstar" won an Ivor Novello Award and is estimated to have sold at least five million copies worldwide.

In 2007, Tim Wheeler of Ash wrote that "Telstar" was one of the earliest pop tracks influenced by science fiction, and that "for its time it was so futuristic and it still sounds pretty weird today". He observed the influence of "Telstar" in the 2006 single "Knights of Cydonia" by Muse; Muse's singer and guitarist, Matt Bellamy, is the son of the Tornados guitarist George Bellamy.

Lawsuits 
French composer Jean Ledrut accused Joe Meek of plagiarism, claiming that the tune of "Telstar" had been copied from "La Marche d'Austerlitz", a piece from a score that Ledrut had written for the film Austerlitz (1960). This led to a lawsuit that prevented Meek from receiving royalties from the record during his lifetime, and the issue was not resolved in Meek's favour until three weeks after his suicide in 1967. Austerlitz was not released in the UK until 1965, and Meek was unaware of the film when the lawsuit was filed in March 1963.

Commercial performance
The record was an immediate hit after its release, remaining in the UK Singles Chart for 25 weeks, five of them at number 1, and in the American charts for 16 weeks. "Telstar" was the first U.S. number one by a British group. Up to that point, and since World War II, there had only been three British names that topped the U.S. chart: the first was "Auf Wiederseh'n Sweetheart" by Vera Lynn (1952); the second was "He's Got the Whole World in His Hands" by Laurie London (1958); and the third was in May 1962 with "Stranger on the Shore" by clarinetist Acker Bilk.

Track listing
 "Telstar"
 "Jungle Fever"

Credits and personnel

The Tornados
Clem Cattini – drums
Alan Caddy – lead guitar
Roger LaVern – additional keyboards
George Bellamy – rhythm guitar
Heinz Burt – bass

Other
Joe Meek – composer, producer
Geoff Goddard – clavioline (on both sides) plus wordless vocals in the final playing of the theme (also on both sides)
Dave Adams – transcription of Meek's composition recording

Charts

Other uses
The former British Prime Minister Margaret Thatcher named "Telstar" as one of her favourite pop songs.

See also 
 List of Billboard Hot 100 number-ones by British artists
 "Early Bird", 1965 instrumental named after Intelsat I

Notes

According to OCC it is the second instrumental number one of 1962 in the UK, the first being "Wonderful Land" by The Shadows which was No 1 for more weeks than any other single that year (eight).

References

External links
 Roger LaVern: The Recording Of The Worldwide Hit "Telstar"

1962 singles
UK Singles Chart number-one singles
Decca Records singles
London Records singles
Mercury Records singles
Number-one singles in Belgium
Irish Singles Chart number-one singles
Billboard Hot 100 number-one singles
Cashbox number-one singles
The Tornados songs
Song recordings produced by Joe Meek
Margie Singleton songs
1962 songs
Songs involved in plagiarism controversies
1960s instrumentals
Pop instrumentals